The Waldorf School of Baltimore is a private, co-education school that was established in 1971 under the name New Morning School. It is located in the Cold Spring Newtown community, Baltimore, Maryland. It adopted the Waldorf curriculum in 1972 and now offers Parent/Child classes for infants and toddlers, a Nursery and Kindergarten program and Grades 1-8. It is a Maryland Green School. The current address of the building is 4801 Tamarind Rd, Baltimore, MD 21209.

Curriculum 

Waldorf schools hold firm against some current trends in education.  Teaching with technology in the pre-school and lower grades is not seen in Waldorf schools; technology in middle schools is unusual beyond library science. Waldorf schools are known for teacher-led activities and hands-on learning with open-ended toys made of natural materials and low-tech tools.  Waldorf early childhood programs resist the pressure to bring early academics into pre-school years; teachers carefully construct environments that allow for exploration, imitation and self-guided play, insisting that these are age-appropriate goals. Waldorf schools question the efficacy of frequent standardized testing; such methods as observational assessment, grades given for specific assignments and narrative reports are held to be of higher value.

Licensing 
The Waldorf School of Baltimore is licensed by the State of Maryland Board of Education, is a fully accredited member of the Association of Independent Maryland Schools (AIMS), and is a full member of and accredited by the Waldorf Early Childhood Association of North America and the Association of Waldorf Schools of North America (AWSNA).

Tuition  
The tuition at Waldorf School for 2017-18 is:
Grades 5–8 $19,960
Grades 1-4 $19,640
Kindergarten
5 full days per week (five or six years old on 8/1) $18,380
5 full days per week (four and one-half to five years old on 8/1) $17,320
5 mornings per week (four and one-half to five years old on 8/1) $13,950

Tuition includes all required textbooks and supplies except musical instruments.

Community services 
 
The Waldorf School of Baltimore helped out their local communities with different events, such as
Relay Foods. 
WSB (Waldorf School of Baltimore) host an annual fair on their school ground. Activities include jump rope making, beeswax candling, fishing game, marionette shows, live music and others.

Notable alumni

See also
Curriculum of the Waldorf schools

References

External links

Educational institutions established in 1971
Private schools in Baltimore
Private elementary schools in Maryland
Private middle schools in Maryland
Waldorf schools in the United States
1971 establishments in Maryland